Dorel Zamfir (born 30 September 1961) is a Romanian former footballer who played as a right midfielder.

Club career
Dorel Zamfir was born on 30 September 1961 in Vișeu de Sus, Maramureș County, but when he was two months old, his parents settled in his father's city, Constanța. He started playing football at age 7, at FC Constanța's youth center, making his debut for the senior team when he played a full match at the age of 15 years, five months and 16 days on 16 March 1977 under coach Gheorghe Ola in a Divizia A home match which ended with a 1–0 loss against Steaua București. In the beginning of 1980, he went to play for Dinamo București, a team with which he won the 1981–82 Divizia A, playing 9 games in the campaign and the Cupa României, also playing his only game in a European competition, a 3–0 victory against Levski Sofia in the 1981–82 UEFA Cup. In 1982 he played for Dinamo's rival, Steaua București, after which he went to play for six seasons at Argeș Pitești. In the following years of his career, Zamfir went to play for Gloria Bistrița, also heaving some experiences playing abroad in Turkey and Israel, ending his career as a player-coach at Flacăra Moreni.

International career
Dorel Zamfir represented Romania U20 at the 1981 World Youth Championship from Australia, playing 5 games in which he scored one goal in a 1–1 against Brazil in the group stage, helping the team finish the tournament in the 3rd position, winning the bronze medal. After the tournament, Zamfir decided to remain in Australia, at that time defection from the Socialist Republic of Romania being illegal, but he willingly returned to back to the country.

Honours
Dinamo București
Divizia A: 1981–82
Cupa României: 1981–82

References

1961 births
Living people
Romanian footballers
Association football midfielders
Romania youth international footballers
Liga I players
FCV Farul Constanța players
FC Dinamo București players
FC Steaua București players
FC Argeș Pitești players
ACF Gloria Bistrița players 
CSM Flacăra Moreni players 
Romanian expatriate footballers
Expatriate footballers in Turkey
Romanian expatriate sportspeople in Turkey
Expatriate footballers in Israel
Romanian expatriate sportspeople in Israel
Romanian football managers
CSM Flacăra Moreni managers
Romanian defectors
People from Maramureș County